Eupithecia placidata is a moth in the family Geometridae first described by Taylor in 1908. It is found in western North America from British Columbia south to California.

The wingspan is about 20 mm. The forewings have a greyish ground color with rather obscure maculation apart from two black crosslines. Adults have been recorded on wing from February to October.

The larvae feed on Juniperus scopulorum, Juniperus communis, Thuja plicata, Populus balsamifera trichocarpa, Pinus strobus, Pinus contorta var. latifolia, Pseudotsuga menziesii var. glauca, Abies lasiocarpa, Tsuga heterophylla and Betula papyrifera. The larvae are twig mimics. They are rusty brown with a greenish-brown head. Full-grown larvae reach a length of about 20 mm. Larvae can be found from mid-July to September and pupation occurs in September. The species overwinters in the pupal stage.

References

Moths described in 1908
placidata
Moths of North America